Cathy Scott-Clark is a British journalist and author. She has worked with the Sunday Times and The Guardian. She has co-authored six books with Adrian Levy.

Books 
Seven books co-authored with Adrian Levy:

 The Stone of Heaven: Unearthing the Secret History of Imperial Green Jade. Back Bay Books (2003)
 The Amber Room: The Fate of the World's Greatest Lost Treasure, Viking. (2004)
 Deception: Pakistan, The United States and the Global Nuclear Weapons Conspiracy. Atlantic Books (2007)
 The Meadow: Kashmir 1995—Where the Terror Began (2012)
 The Siege: The Attack on the Taj, Penguin Books. (2013)
 The Exile: The Stunning Inside Story of Osama Bin Laden and Al Qaeda in Flight, Bloomsbury. (2017)
Spy Stories: Inside the Secret World of the R.A.W. and the I.S.I. (2021)

Awards 

 Ramnath Goenka Award for Excellence in Journalism, 2012
 British Journalist of the Year 2009, One World Trust

References 

British women journalists
Living people
Year of birth missing (living people)